Besut is a district in Terengganu, Malaysia. It is bordered by the state of Kelantan to the north and west and the South China Sea to the east. It is the northern gateway to Terengganu. Kampung Raja is the district capital, though Jerteh is more developed. Another major town is the fishing port of Kuala Besut. There are other small towns and villages such as Jabi, Apal, Pasir Akar and Tembila.

History

There is a lack of written evidence on this district. The records by Munshi Abdullah in his book, Kisah Pelayaran Abdullah ke Kelantan, and Tuhfat al-Nafis by Raja Ali Haji touched a bit on Besut. Due to this, there are many stories that tell the matters regarding the origin of Besut.

Administrative divisions

Besut District is divided into 9 mukims, which are:
 Bukit Kenak
 Bukit Puteri
 Hulu Besut
 Jabi
 Kampung Raja
 Keluang
 Kerandang
 Kuala Besut
 Kubang Bemban
 Lubuk Kawah
 Pasir Akar
 Pelagat
 Pengkalan Nangka
 Perhentian Islands
 Tembila
 Tenang

Population

As of 2010, there are approximately 140,952 people in Besut District, of various ethnicity, with the Malays being the majority. Other ethnics include Chinese and Siamese. Most Malays in Besut identify themselves with Kelantanese identity rather than the Terengganuan identity. One of the prominent examples is that they tend to speak Kelantanese Malay instead of Terengganu Malay like in most parts of Terengganu. Meanwhile, the dominant minority ethnic Chinese population are more concentrated near Jerteh town.

Education
Besut has education institutions which are developed by both the central and Terengganu state governments such as, Universiti Sultan Zainal Abidin, Institute of Teacher's Education Sultan Mizan Campus, MARA Junior Science College (Kota Putra & Besut campuses), Kolej Komuniti Besut, Sekolah Menengah Kebangsaan Tengku Mahmud, Sekolah Menengah Agama Maarif, Sekolah Menengah Kebangsaan Agama Nurul Ittifaq, Madrasah Moden MAIDAM Besut and Sekolah Menengah IMTIAZ, Sekolah Menengah Agama Ittifakiah, among others. Hence, Besut is known as one of the best educational hub towns in Malaysia.

Tourism
There are a number of travel destinations that are located here, many of them islands or beaches. The most popular of all tourist sites in Besut are Perhentian Islands, one of the top island destinations in the world according to the CNN. Perhentian Islands lie about 10.8 nautical miles (20 km) to the north east of Kuala Besut and are made up of islands such as Perhentian Besar, Perhentian Kecil, and Susu Dara. The islands are well known for their tropical reefs, scuba diving, and snorkeling.

Besides Perhentian Islands, beaches are also among the top local places to visit. The beaches here are Air Tawar, Dendong, and Bukit Keluang beach. In the interior parts of the district, visitors can experience the tropical forest in areas such as Lata Tembakah and Lata Belatan, or climb the 1039m-high Gunung Tebu (Mount Tebu). Tourists can also enjoy bathing in the natural hot springs of Kolam Air Panas La or La Hot Springs. The water here contains sulphur and can reach 49 °C.

Federal Parliament and State Assembly Seats 

List of Besut district representatives in the Federal Parliament (Dewan Rakyat)

List of Besut district representatives in the State Legislative Assembly of Terengganu

See also

 Districts of Malaysia

References